Hyposmocoma subcitrella is a species of moth of the family Cosmopterigidae. It was first described by Lord Walsingham in 1907. It is endemic to the Hawaiian island of Kauai.

The larvae probably feed on lichen on the bark of Cheirodendron and Metrosideros.

The larval case, which is coated with frass, is streaked with black, especially along its lower edge. It bulges in the middle and is attenuate to either end, the ends obtuse.

External links

subcitrella
Endemic moths of Hawaii
Moths described in 1907
Taxa named by Thomas de Grey, 6th Baron Walsingham